Società Anonima Navigazione Aerea (abbreviated SANA) was an Italian airline established 1925 in Genoa, concentrating on flying boat routes in the western Mediterranean area.

History

The initial route, Genoa, Rome, Naples, Palermo was started on April 7, 1926. The seaplanes utilized were built in Marina di Pisa under license from Dornier.

SANA in 1929 started to market its air service with Italian names: the air route to Barcelona (Spain) was called Freccia del Mediterraneo (Arrow of the Mediterranean), the air route between Genova and Palermo was called Freccia Verde (Green Arrow) and the one for the Roma – Tripoli air service was named Freccia Rossa (Red Arrow). One year later the international route to Barcelona was renamed Freccia Azzurra (Sky-blue Arrow).

In 1929 was started with the Imperial Airways a route between Italy and Egypt, that was associated with the British imperial flight to India.

According to Rob Mulder, in 1931 -for the number of passengers carried- the best service (with 2,262) was the one between Rome and Genova, followed by Roma – Napoli – Palermo with 2,540 passengers. The link from Syracuse to Libia Italiana and the city of Tripoli was also a popular one and good for 1,392 passengers and 3,876 kg of mail.

In 1934, the airline merged with Aero Espresso Italiana, Società Italiana Servizi Aerei (SISA) and Società Aerea Mediterranea (SAM), to form Ala Littoria, the pre-war national airline of Italy.

Fleet
 Dornier Do J "Wal" (12 passengers, 19 aircraft)
 Dornier Do R "Super Wal" (12 passengers, 6 aircraft)
 Dornier Do X (66 passengers, 2 aircraft)

See also
 Ala Littoria
 List of defunct airlines of Italy

Notes

External links
Timetable images
Seaplanes over the italian seas
Fleet list

Airlines established in 1925
Defunct airlines of Italy
Airlines disestablished in 1934
1925 establishments in Italy
1934 disestablishments in Italy
Defunct seaplane operators